Upchurch is a village and civil parish in the Swale district of Kent, England. It is situated just off the A2 road, between Rainham and Sittingbourne.

History
Upchurch lay on a pre-Roman trackway; the many linking roads are the result of Roman occupation, which had built a community of ex-soldiers who wanted to settle in England. A Roman cemetery has been discovered here. There were also several Roman pottery works sited here. It is probable that, although today the land is low-lying and marshy, it was once higher than it is today.

The Upchurch Hoard is a hoard of well worn coins which date from the first and second century A.D. which were found close to Upchurch in 1950. A more recent pottery was established here in 1909 called the Upchurch Pottery. Although it is now closed it became well known and could be found  retailing through such outlets as Liberty & Co.

Under the grade I listed 14th century church is a small crypt (a charnel house) where bones were kept when the churchyard was full. It was discovered in 1877 and the bones re-interred. The church is also notable for its very unusual 'candle-snuffer' steeple where an octagonal pyramid appears to have been stacked on top of a square one resembling a couple of inverted ice-cream cones. It is believed that the distinctive shape was chosen to serve as a navigational aid for shipping on The River Thames. The wall surrounding the church was found in 2014 also to be listed within the church grade one status.

In 2008 residents with the aid of a National Lottery grant collected and published a book Upchurch in old picture postcards. The project was to collect and maintain photographs that reflected changing village life. The project published most of the collected images.  The book, published by Meresborough Books/ was produced by resident Mike Gunnill. The project to retain old photographs of the area continues under the heading, the Upchurch Collection.

The settlement of Otterham Quay lies a mile west of the village at the head of Otterham Creek. This small port gave young Francis Drake his first experience of the sea. When the last brick field was given planning permission for development, a publication Otterham, Kent: Your Heritage was produced.  The book wanted to record and save the heritage of the area ahead of new housing.

Twinning
Upchurch is twinned with the Commune of Ferques, Pas de Calais, France.

References

External links
 village website.
Upchurch Parish Council

Villages in Kent
Civil parishes in Kent